Mikel Balenziaga Oruesagasti (born 29 February 1988) is a Spanish professional footballer who plays as a left-back for Athletic Bilbao.

Club career
Born in Zumarraga, Gipuzkoa, Balenziaga started his football grooming at Real Sociedad, playing two full seasons with its B team in the Segunda División B. However, in 2008–09, he switched to neighbours Athletic Bilbao.

Initially thought of as a member of the reserve side, Balenziaga quickly beat competition from veterans Koikili and Javier Casas to become the undisputed first choice for the vast majority of the campaign, making his first-team debut on 14 September 2008 in a 0–0 away draw against Málaga CF; another club graduate, Ander Iturraspe, also made his first La Liga appearance in that game.

In July 2009, Athletic bought Xabi Castillo from neighbours Real Sociedad and Balenziaga, seeing his chances for the upcoming season dim, accepted a loan move to CD Numancia, recently relegated from the top division. He transferred to Real Valladolid on a three-year contract in the summer of 2011, after an unassuming campaign in which he made only one official appearance for the Lions.

After two solid years in Castile and León, Balenziaga returned to Athletic for 2013–14 to challenge for a first-team spot under new manager Ernesto Valverde. He scored his first ever goal as a professional on 24 September 2016, helping the hosts to defeat Sevilla FC 3–1 in the domestic league.

International career
Balenziaga appeared once for the Spain under-21 team, playing 58 minutes in a 4–1 friendly away loss to Portugal on 18 November 2008. He also featured for the unofficial Basque Country regional side.

Career statistics

Club

Honours
Athletic Bilbao
Supercopa de España: 2015, 2020–21
Copa del Rey runner-up: 2014–15, 2019–20, 2020–21

Notes

References

External links

1988 births
Living people
People from Goierri
Sportspeople from Gipuzkoa
Spanish footballers
Footballers from the Basque Country (autonomous community)
Association football defenders
La Liga players
Segunda División players
Segunda División B players
Real Sociedad B footballers
Athletic Bilbao footballers
CD Numancia players
Real Valladolid players
Spain youth international footballers
Spain under-21 international footballers
Basque Country international footballers